Edmund Harvey Taylor (1855 – 30 September 1927) was a Liberal Party Member of Parliament in New Zealand.

Biography

Early life and career
Taylor was born in Laneast in Cornwall, England, in 1855, the son of John Taylor, a prominent farmer. He studied in Liskeard to become a preacher of the Methodist church. His first placements were in Manchester, Birmingham, and Cheltenham.

He emigrated to New Zealand in 1882 and became prominent in the temperance movement. He was a member of the Thames Licensing Committee, and was at time secretary and president of the Prohibition League. On 8 July 1885, he married Charlotte "Lottie" Cropp, the eldest daughter of W. H. Cropp of Thames. Her father, a long-term resident of Thames working as an engineer, was active in the Church of Christ.

Political career

He won the Thames electorate in a 1909 by-election after the resignation of McGowan, but was defeated in the next election in 1911 by Thomas William Rhodes. He contested the electorate again in  but Rhodes remained successful.

Later life and death
He later moved to Western Springs in Auckland, where he lived in Springfield Road. He was Reverend for the Congregational church in Morningside.

He died in Cornwall while on a visit to England on 30 September 1927. He was survived by his wife, Charlotte Taylor, and two daughters.

Notes

References

New Zealand Liberal Party MPs
Members of the New Zealand House of Representatives
New Zealand MPs for North Island electorates
1855 births
1927 deaths
Unsuccessful candidates in the 1890 New Zealand general election
Unsuccessful candidates in the 1893 New Zealand general election
Unsuccessful candidates in the 1896 New Zealand general election
Unsuccessful candidates in the 1899 New Zealand general election
Unsuccessful candidates in the 1911 New Zealand general election
Unsuccessful candidates in the 1914 New Zealand general election
English emigrants to New Zealand
New Zealand temperance activists
People from Thames, New Zealand
19th-century New Zealand politicians